During the 2010–11 English football season, Charlton Athletic competed in Football League One.

Results

League One

FA Cup

League Cup

Football League Trophy

Players

First-team squad
Squad at end of season

Left club during season

Transfers in

Winter
Bradley Wright-Phillips – Plymouth
Nathan Eccleston – Liverpool
Federico Bessone – Leeds

References

Notes

External links
Charlton Athletic match record: 2011 at 11v11.com

Charlton Athletic F.C. seasons
Charlton Athletic